Cernache is a civil parish in the municipality of Coimbra, Portugal. The population in 2021 was 3,957, in an area of 19.17 km2.

References 

Freguesias of Coimbra